Ayo is the self-titled second studio album by Nigerian singer Wizkid. It was released on 17 September 2014, by Starboy Entertainment and Empire Mates Entertainment. The album is the follow-up to his debut album Superstar (2011). Ayo was postponed twice due to difficulty in track selection. Preceding its release were the singles "Jaiye Jaiye", "On Top Your Matter", "One Question", "Joy", "Bombay" and "Show You the Money". The album also contains the song "Ojuelegba". Wizkid enlisted Sarz, Shizzi, Uhuru, Del B, Dokta Frabz, Maleek Berry, Legendury Beatz and Spellz to produce the album. Ayo features collaborations with Femi Kuti, Seyi Shay, Yemi Sax, Akon, Banky W., Phyno, Tyga and Wale. It received mixed reviews from music critics, with some commending its production, song arrangement and sound quality, while others panned its lyrics.

Background and development
Wizkid started recording Ayo after the release of the compilation album Empire Mates State of Mind (2012). The album was initially meant to be a mixtape. In an interview with MTV's The Wrap Up, Wizkid said the mixtape would include production and guest vocals from Rodney Rhymez, Maleek Berry and Wale. Wizkid later told Ok!Nigeria TV that the mixtape would feature Tinie Tempah and would be released in April 2013. Wizkid announced on Twitter that he would release the mixtape after he released an album in June. That same month, he posted a picture on Instagram revealing most of the album's track list. The photo revealed features with Femi Kuti, Efya, Don Jazzy, Seyi Shay and Banky W.

In October 2013, Banky W. told HipTV that the album would be titled Chosen. In December 2013, Wizkid spoke to iCR8Media about the album and said he worked with producers such as Don Jazzy, Dokta Frabz, Legendury Beatz, Maleek Berry, Spellz and Sarz. He also said he collaborated with Olamide, Efya, Seyi Shay, Shaydee, Banky W., L.A.X and Dammy Krane. In May 2014, Wizkid told the website Fuse.com.ng that the album would drop on June 12, 2014, a day that acknowledges the annulled 1993 Nigerian presidential election. Moreover, he said the album would be self-titled Ayo (Yoruba: Joy). On 6 September 2013, Wizkid unveiled the album's official cover and track list on Instagram. A week earlier, he told Olisa Adibua that the album would be his last body of work under Empire Mates Entertainment.

Promotion
Wizkid promoted the album by releasing several promotional singles and headlining a few concerts. On 29 July 2013, he released his first ever collaborative single with Wale, titled "Drop". The song was produced by Legendury Beatz. Wizkid's second collaborative single with Wale, titled "Nobody But You", was released on 24 October 2013. The song was produced by Maleek Berry. On 17 December 2013, Wizkid premiered the Legendury Beatz-produced track "Eledumare", which was performed at the 2013 Felabration concert. On 24 March 2014, MTV Base reported that Wizkid was invited as a special guest for some shows in Tinie Tempah's tour of the UK in 2014.

Singles
The Femi Kuti-assisted track "Jaiye Jaiye" was released on 2 May 2013, as the album's lead single. The song was produced by Sarz and mastered by Foster Zeeno. The music video for "Jaiye Jaiye" was shot and directed in Lagos by Sesan.

The album's second single "On Top Your Matter" was released on 25 October 2013, in celebration of Valentine's Day. The accompanying music video for "On Top Your Matter" was shot and directed in Johannesburg by Sesan. The album's third single "One Question" was released on 14 February 2014. It features a saxophone riff by Yemi Sax and was produced by Dokta Frabz. Wizkid performed the song for BBC's Destination Africa in March 2014.

On 9 June 2014, "Joy" and "Bombay" were released simultaneously as the album's fourth and fifth singles, respectively. Both songs were produced by Dokta Frabz. Wizkid performed a cover of "No Woman, No Cry" at Koga Studios for BBC's Destination Africa and merged "Joy" with the cover. On 13 June 2014, the music video for "Bombay" was released to YouTube.

On 16 July 2014, the Shizzi-produced track "Show You the Money" was released as the album's sixth single. The visuals for the song was directed by Patrick Elis and features cameo appearances from Ehiz and Dokta Frabz. Lekan Oladimeji of P.M. News awarded the video 6.5 stars out of 10, stating: "though a video that lacks a sense of direction, low creativity and could have been achieved with next to no technical know how, it remains a video you might want to see time and over again as there’s always something to smile about."

Bonus song and other releases
The L.A.X-assisted track  "Caro" was added to the album as a bonus; the song was produced by Legendury Beatz. The music video for "Caro" was shot and directed in London by Moe Musa and uploaded to YouTube on 20 August 2013. "Caro" was nominated for Hottest Single of the Year at the 2014 Nigeria Entertainment Awards, and for Song of the Year at the 2014 African Muzik Magazine Awards. On 22 September 2014, Wizkid released the Soto Jose-directed music video for "In My Bed". The following month, "In My Bed" charted at number five on The Tides list of the Top 10 Songs of the Week. The music video for "Ojuelegba" was released on 5 January 2015. It was shot and directed in Lagos by Clarence Peters.

Critical reception

Ayo received generally mixed reviews from music critics and consumers. Oscar Okeke of Lobatan awarded the album an A rating, concluding: "His eponymously album reminds us why he has earned our respect and why he continues to rule over the realm of sound, money and girls." Tola Sarumi of NotJustOk assigned a rating of 4.5 out of 10, criticizing it for relying profoundly on the popularity of previously released content. The duo at Should You Bump This characterized the album as lacking direction and described it as a "sack of undiluted disappointment." Jim Donnett of TooXclusive gave the album 2 stars out of 5, calling it  "weak".

Ayomide Tayo of Nigerian Entertainment Today awarded the album 3 stars out of 5, concluding: "On Ayo (Joy), Wizkid shows that he either doesn't have what it fully takes to make creative gambles for an artiste of his calibre or he is pretty much comfortable in flogging a dead horse until it has no more skin or flesh." Also reviewing for Nigerian Entertainment Today, Dayo Showemimo granted the album 3.5 stars out of 5, stating: "Wizkid remains the same old Wizkid we all know on this album, the style of singing is the same, no wow factor, no climax, nothing out of the ordinary, nothing spectacular in Wizkid’s delivery." Rolling Stone magazine included the album on its list of the "15 Great Albums You Didn't Hear in 2014", and stated that Wizkid "uses deft, nimble flows to glide over complex beats and he writes hooks that will keep you humming for weeks."

Accolades
Ayo won Best R&B/Pop Album and was nominated for Album of the Year at The Headies 2015. The album was also nominated for Album of the Year at the 2015 Nigeria Entertainment Awards.

Track listing

Personnel
Credits adapted from the back cover of Ayo

 Ayodeji Balogun – main artist, executive producer, writer, performer
 Segun Demuren – executive producer
 Banky Wellington – executive producer, featured artist, writer  
 Osaretin "Sarz" Osabuohien – producer
 Sheyi "Shizzi" Akerele – producer
 Uhuru – producer
 Del B – producer
 Dokta Frabz – producer  
 Maleek Berry – producer 
 Legendury Beatz – producer
 Ben'Jamin "Spellz" Obadje – producer 
 Femi Kuti – featured artist 
 Yemi Sax – featured artist
 Deborah Joshua – featured artist, writer
 Aliaune Thiam – featured artist, writer
 Azubuike Nelson – featured artist, writer
 Michael Nguyen-Stevenson – featured artist, writer
 Olubowale Akintimehin – featured artist, writer

Release history

References

2014 albums
Wizkid albums
Yoruba-language albums
Albums produced by Shizzi
Albums produced by Del B
Albums produced by Uhuru (record producer)
Albums produced by Spellz
Albums produced by Maleek Berry
Albums produced by Legendury Beatz
Albums produced by Sarz
Albums produced by Dokta Frabz
2014 in Nigerian music